Aleksandr Reshideovich Dyukov, (born October 17, 1978) is a Russian author and blogger. Dyukov is considered by critics to be a historical negationist downplaying Soviet repressions. He is persona non grata in Latvia, Lithuania and other Schengen member-states.

Career
Aleksandr Dyukov graduated from the Russian State University for the Humanities in 2004. The topic of his dissertation was the Soviet partisan movement in 1941–1943. From 2004 to 2007, Dyukov worked for the ARMS-TASS Agency of Military and Technical Information. He contributed as issuing editor of the weekly Military and Technical Cooperation, later promoted to its editor-in-chief. He has published two books in REGNUM News Agency. However, REGNUM has since ceased cooperation with him following a conflict over Dyukov's statements in the Russian and Estonian media that his Historical Memory Foundation was primarily responsible for these publications.

Dyukov was a member of the working group set up by the Russian State Duma preparing a draft for a law on combating the rehabilitation of Nazism.

Controversy
One of Dyukov's spheres of interest is the history of Soviet repression, mostly in the Baltic states and Ukraine, and more recently, he has written a controversial paper downplaying the massacres at Kurapaty in Belarus. While Dyukov employs open archives such as from the State Archive of the Russian Federation (GARF) and the Russian State Archive of Contemporary History (RGANI), he also cites the archives of the FSB, to which access by researchers is limited. It is these FSB archives which Dyukov uses, for example, to claim in his recent book, The Genocide Myth, that Estonia's recollection of Soviet repressions including deportations is exaggerated. In regard to the June 1941 deportations, that took place before German invasion of June 22, 1941, Dyukov contends that deported Estonians were mostly German collaborators or were linked to them.

In a 2007 interview with Russia's REGNUM News Agency, Dyukov claimed that some Estonian historians were repeating false claims by the Nazi propaganda and said: "Another example of unfair approach Estonian official historians is that in describing the deportation of 14 June 1941, they always mention that the deportees were transported in stock cars, with each car stuffed to 40-50 people, including women, children and the elderly. Therefore, they say, this deportation caused massive mortality. However, if we turn to the NKVD documents, a fair amount of which has already been published, one finds that, firstly, the transportation of deportees was carried out in passenger cars 'equipped for summer human traffic.' Secondly, each railroad car carried not 40-50, but about 30 deportees. Third, according to railroad documents, mass death was impossible. It can't be ruled out that during this deportation, not a single person died. Estonian historians, by the way, somehow forget that in every echelon of deportees there was an ambulance railroad car, which was accompanied by a doctor, paramedic and two nurses."  In reaction to Dyukov's book, the newspaper Eesti Ekspress in Estonia denounced him as a revisionist historian who paints a picture of Soviet political repressions as "little worse than a family picnic".

Irina Pavlova, a historian of the Soviet system under Lenin and Stalin, has commented that Dyukov promotes "a new prison guard's concept of Soviet history" based on his "blind faith in the documents provided by the FSB archives".

A. Dykov's name has found mentioning in Estonia's Security Police (Kapo) 2008 yearbook, according to which Dykov, although lacking both post-secondary degree academic degree, has been granted exclusive access to FSB (former USSR's KGB) archive. The yearbook claimed that Mr Dykov's activities are approved by Russia's FSB. As of March 2012, Dykov has been prevented from entering Latvia by the Latvian Government, who cited concerns that Dykov's activities are harming the Latvian state and its citizens. According to spokesperson of Latvian Foreign Affairs Ministry, Dykov has been blacklisted in Schengen memberstates visa database. In August 2014, Dyukov was denied entry into Lithuania.

In response to the Dyukov's critique on The Soviet Story, the American photographer of Russian origin Sergey Melnikoff, expresses an opinion that Dyukov is associated with the Russian Federal Security Service. Dyukov previously stated that "After watching two thirds of the film, I had only one wish: to kill its director and to burn down the Latvian Embassy."

Published works

Books

References

External links
 "Актуальная история" Alexander Dyukov's blog
 Dyukov's e-books at "Public Library"
 Information on Alexander Dyukov on the web site "Новые хроники"

1978 births
Living people
21st-century Russian historians
Russian journalists
Russian State University for the Humanities alumni
Historical negationism